Buntovnik is the fifth studio album by Montenegrin dance-pop recording artist Dado Polumenta. It was released 18 November 2010 through the record label Grand Production.

Background

Buntovnik was announced 28 September 2010, two months prior to its release. The album was released by the record company Grand Production, Polumenta's first album under the label since 100 stepeni (2005).

"Sedam Subota" is a duet with Serbian singer Aca Lukas.

Singles
The album's second single "Nije od karmina" was released 15 October 2010 and the video premiered 20 May 2011.

Track listing
Fali mi ljubav
Sedam subota (featuring Aca Lukas)
Nije od karmina
Tijana
Greška
Od vina si me opila
Ja i ti
Koliko puta kažem neću
Lanjski snijegovi

References

External links
Buntovnik at Discogs
Buntovnik at iTunes

2010 albums
Dado Polumenta albums
Grand Production albums